Diamond Glacier is a small distributary glacier of the Darwin Glacier, flowing east-northeast into the narrow valley on the north side of Diamond Hill. Mapped by the Victoria University of Wellington Antarctic Expedition (VUWAE) (1962-63) and named after Diamond Hill.

References 

Glaciers of Antarctica